The Duff Islands are a small island group lying to the northeast of the Santa Cruz Islands in the Solomon Islands province of Temotu. They are also sometimes known as the Wilson Islands.

Location and geography
The islands are located at 9°51'48" S. lat., 167°4'48" E. long.

The Duff Islands consist of:
Taumako, the main island, with nearby Tahua, Tohua, and Tatumotu
The Bass Islands: Lua, Kaa and Loreva
Treasurer's Islands: Tuleki (Nula), Elingi (Obelisk Island), Te Aku (Te Ako), Lakao and Ulaka

Frequently, Hallie Jackson Reef is mentioned in the context of the Duff islands, although it is located 45 km west of that 32 km long island chain, and although it is not an island, at most a submarine reef. In the Sailing Directions of 1969 Hallie Jackson Reef is described as a reef 24 feet deep, at 9°44'S, 166°07'E. The corresponding current (2017) publication no longer has any mention of the reef.

Local population
The Duff Islands were settled by the Lapita people about 900 BC. They were followed by Melanesians and then Polynesians in the mid-1400s. The modern inhabitants of the Duff Islands are Polynesians, and their language, Vaeakau-Taumako, is a member of the Samoic branch of Polynesian languages. On the islands of Duff live about 500 people. The traditional way of life consists of subsistence farming and fishing. Taumako has no roads, airport, telephones, or electricity. Contact with outsiders comes by battery-powered marine radio and the occasional cargo ship.

European Contact
The first recorded sighting by Europeans of the Duff Islands was by the Spanish expedition of Pedro Fernández de Quirós where it anchored on 8 April 1606. Its inhabitants named the islands as Taumako. They were charted by Quirós as Nuestra Señora del Socorro (Our Lady of Succour in Spanish).

The Duff Islands were named after missionary ship Duff, captained by James Wilson, which reached them in 1797.

Traditional navigation 
Studies of David Lewis and  Marianne (Mimi) George identified that traditional Polynesian navigational techniques were still preserved in these islands.

See also

Melanesia
Oceania
Pacific Islands
Pacific Ocean
Polynesian outlier
Three other Bass islands

References 
 Duff Islands, Solomon Islands, solomonislands.com.sb
 Ben Finney and Sam Low, "Navigation", in K.R. Howe (ed.), Vaka Moana: Voyages of the Ancestors, Bateman, 2007. 

Specific

External links
The Vaka Taumako Project

Islands of the Solomon Islands
Polynesian outliers
Archipelagoes of the Pacific Ocean